New Swears is a four-piece Canadian band consisting of Sammy J. Scorpion, Beej Eh, Nick Nofun, Stoney and S-Mike. Their music has been classified as garage punk or power pop.

History 
New Swears was formed in 2012 in Ottawa, Ontario at the Fun Boy Club House, where the band lived.  New Swears are composed of brothers Beej Eh and Sammy J. Scorpion, with Nick Nofun, and Scru Bar. The band released its first  LP, Funny Isn't Real, in 2013 on cassette under Bruised Tongue Records and released it on vinyl shortly thereafter through Dirt Cult Records and Bachelor Records.  Their second album, Junkfood Forever, Bedtime Whatever (reviews), was released in 2014 under Bachelor Records and later under Dirt Cult Records.

New Swears signed with Dine Alone Records on October 7, 2016  and in that same month released as singles, Brand New Spot and Sugar Heavy Metal on 7" vinyl and digital formats under Dine Alone Records.  Their third full-length LP, And the Magic of Horses (reviews ), was released in June 2017 under Dine Alone Records.  New Swears released two singles, "Illuminati Knights" and "Happy Birthday" under Dine Alone Records in December 2017.  All proceeds from the sale of the tracks went towards For Pivots Sake and Girls + Skate 613 in support of access to skateboarding for the youth of Ottawa.

In 2018 there were a few changes to the bands structure with Scru Bar leaving the band.  Sammy J. Scorpion took his place as co-guitar player with his brother Beej Eh.  Nick Nofun moved from the drums to replace Sammy on the bass and Stoney stepped up as the new member, and locally experienced drummer.  S-Mike provided added sound on occasion as keyboard player.  On March 28, 2019 Pure Grain Audio leaked the song and music video for their new single "Angel".  On April 18, 2919 Dine Alone Records announced the date of release of their newest album, "Night Mirror", on June 13, 2019, and made available two singles from the album, "Bon Voyage" and "Rolling Stone".

Live Performances
The band completed their first tour of Europe in the fall of 2014. In 2015 the New Swears performed at the Ottawa Bluesfest (reviews). They also performed at the Arboretum Festival, Maker Space North, and Ottawa Explosion.  In June 2017, under Dine Alone Records, they embarked on a tour across Canada and the US as well as a three-week tour over to Europe in the Fall of 2017. The band continued touring Canada through 2018 with a string of shows on their way to an appearance at Elora Riverfest.

The band is well known for their energetic live shows that has traditionally involved confetti cannons, silly string, costumes, wigs and other party props. The band members have been known to assemble into human pyramids on stage without missing a beat.

Current Band members
Sammy J. Scorpion – Guitar, Bass Guitar, Vocals
Beej Eh – Guitar, Bass Guitar, Vocals
Nick Nofun – Drums, Bass Guitar, Vocals
Stoney – Drums, Vocals
S-Mike - Keyboard

Discography

Albums

Other
Now That's What I Call Music 666 Vol. II - 24 tracks - Various Artists (New Swears track 10) - Fuzzkill Records, Scotland, Oct 2015.
Deathcats and New Swears split - 8 tracks - Split tape - Fuzzkill Records, Scotland, December 5, 2014.
Now That's What I Call Music 666 - 16 tracks - Various Artists (New Swears track 2) - Fuzzkill Records, Scotland, Sept 27, 2014.
Satan Loves You - Single Track - Recorded at the Funboy Clubhouse, Ottawa, ON, February 2013.
New Swears/Swollen Eyes Split Tape - 6 tracks - Recorded at the Funboy Clubhouse, Ottawa, ON, August 7, 2012.

See also

Canadian rock
List of bands from Canada

References

External links
Official New Swears Bandcamp site
Official New Swears site
 New Swears - Facebook site

Musical groups established in 2012
Musical groups from Ottawa
Garage punk groups
Canadian indie rock groups
Musical collectives
2012 establishments in Ontario
Dine Alone Records artists